L. W. de Laurence  (full name Lauron William de Laurence) was an American author and publisher on occult and spiritual topics.

Life
De Laurence was born on 31 October 1868 in Cleveland, Ohio, the eldest child of William and Mary (née Walker) Lawrence. He was married twice: the first time was in 1897 to Orrie Eckert in Ohio and the second time in about 1905 to Pauline McAdoo in Illinois.

Career
His publishing company (De Laurence, Scott & Co.) and spiritual supply mail order house was located in Chicago, Illinois. De Laurence was a pioneer in the business of supplying magical and occult goods by mail order, and his distribution of public domain books, such as Secrets of the Psalms by Godfrey Selig and Pow Wows or the Long-Lost Friend by John George Hohman had a great and lasting effect on the African American urban hoodoo community in the southern United States as well as on the development of Obeah in Jamaica.

Although he is mocked and reviled among modern occultists for his plagiarism of A.E. Waite's 1910 book The Pictorial Key to the Tarot, and the S.L. MacGregor Mathers version of the Key of Solomon, he also wrote his own works, including The Master Key a personal development book. In addition, he is believed to have co-written some books with his fellow Chicago resident, the prolific New Thought and yoga author William Walker Atkinson.

In early 1930 he was consecrated a bishop by the Spiritualist Arthur Edward Leighton (1890 to 1963), a bishop of the American Catholic Church (a church body founded by Joseph René Vilatte). One surprising result of de Laurence's consecration was that it helped influence the move of some black spiritualist churches towards a more traditional view of Christianity and in the year of his death, 1936, he may have consecrated the first bishops for these churches, e.g. Thomas B. Watson (1898 to 1985) of New Orleans.

Death
De Laurence died on 11 September 1936 in Chicago, at the age of 68.

de Laurence and Jamaica Customs regulations
According to the most recent regulations of the Jamaica Customs, prohibited items that are absolutely forbidden from entering Jamaica include "All publications of de Laurence Scott and Company of Chicago in the United States of America relating to divination, magic, cultism or supernatural arts."

References

External links

 
 
 

American occult writers
1868 births
1936 deaths
People from Ravenna, Ohio
Bishops of Independent Catholic denominations